The Golden Game is the name of an event held in Toronto, Ontario, Canada on February 28, 2010 in order to "Cheer for Charity" and witness the championship Gold Medal men's Olympic hockey game.  The media exposure of The Golden Game reached 11 million Canadians.  Team Canada won the gold medal against Team USA in an over-time victory that finished with a story-book ending, with the winning goal by Sidney Crosby.  Furthermore, commentators have noted that there was perfect symmetry between the 2002 winter games and 2010 winter games (in all four cases, the Canadian Women's and Canadian Men's hockey teams beat their American counterparts for a gold medal).

The Golden Game: The Golden Path 
 The Golden Path is a charity concept developed in order to provide children with funding for organized sports and humbly embark on the ambitious project of making society a better place.

The belief is that through organized sports children acquire coaching/mentor-ship, self-esteem/empowerment, physical fitness, team-dynamics, a sense of reward and fulfillment derived from dedication to a single task.  These attributes allow children (and in particular children from less privileged communities) to follow a golden path in life.  With any luck, greater success on this journey will bring home more medals to the host country making everyone proud.  A web-based dimension of the donor/recipient relationship will allow not only money to exchange hands but also encouragement, feedback and live, online mentoring.

The two official charities for The Golden Game are Right to Play Canada and Canadian Athlete's Now Fund.

Organizers, partners, and sponsors 
 Title Sponsor: Infinite Logic
 Other Sponsors: Universal Music Canada, Roots Canada, Got Style Menswear, Wind Mobile, Steam Whistle Brewing, Red Bull Canada, Sharkwater Productions, Lux Modern Rentals, Crema, Cucci's and Moog Audio.
 Partners: The Media Merchants, Hockey Toronto, Hockey Canada, Hockey Hall of Fame, Pink Mafia, Embrace, Locol Productions, Torontette, ArchiParti, Royal Pony Creative, FraggleRock, Depict PR, The Social nightclub, The Drake, and Narrative Advocacy PR – Bensimon Byrne Ad Agency
 Venue: The Great Hall, Queen Street West, Toronto
 Event Director: Scott McDonald
 Event Organizers: Elizabeth Phipps, Allison Brough, Denise Robinson and Rita Lwanga
 Event Photographer: Lucia Graca
 Event Videographer: Shiren Van Coten
 Charities: Right to Play, & Canadian Athlete's Now Fund.

100 Sports Bar Network 
The Golden Game event staff contacted 100 sports bars and venue locations across the Greater Toronto Area, from Oakville and Brampton to North York and Oshawa in order to include them in the event.  These satellite locations agreed to broadcast the gold medal hockey game and to donate some portion of their additional revenue to The Golden Path charities (Right to Play + Canadian Athletes Now Fund).

Political partners 
Five key political contacts contributed to this event to make it possible.  First, Toronto city councillor for Ward 6 (Etobicoke-Lakeshore) Mark Grimes connected the event organizers to Hockey Canada, Hockey Toronto and Hockey Hall of Fame.  In addition, four mayoral candidates submitted or read their answers on stage at The Golden Game, to the following two questions: "How will you make sports more accessible to Torontonians?" And, "what three words best describe the new Toronto under your leadership?"

The mayoral candidates who participated (in order of placement in which they appeared): George Smitherman, Giorgio Mammoliti, Sarah Thomson and Rocco Rossi.

Fifa Fest: The Golden Cup 
The Golden Cup provided a search function to locate the nearest venue to your postal code, an open-source country page for each country competing in the tournament as well as video journal that searched and interviewed Torontonians to discover the soul of our city. The final event was held at School Bakery and Cafe and hosted over 3,000 attendees as well as all five front runner mayoral candidates on stage at the half time show raffling away prizes to raise money for The Right to Play.

References

External links 
 Official Site
 Post Event Photos & Media website
 Fifa Golden Cup website
 Eventbrite Site

Organizations based in Toronto
2010 in Toronto
Ice hockey at the 2010 Winter Olympics